The 2016 FSP Gold River Women's Challenger was a professional tennis tournament played on outdoor hard courts. It was the fifth edition of the tournament and part of the 2016 ITF Women's Circuit, offering a total of $50,000 in prize money. It took place in Sacramento, California, United States, on 18–24 July 2016.

Singles main draw entrants

Seeds 

 1 Rankings as of 11 July 2016.

Other entrants 
The following player received a wildcard into the singles main draw:
  Claire Liu
  Ellie Halbauer
  Sabrina Santamaria
  Karina Vyrlan

The following players received entry from the qualifying draw:
  Lizette Cabrera
  Chanel Simmonds
  Valeria Solovyeva
  Alexandra Stevenson

The following player received entry by a lucky loser spot:
  Caroline Roméo

Champions

Singles

 Sofia Kenin def.  Grace Min, 4–6, 6–1, 6–4

Doubles

 Ashley Weinhold /  Caitlin Whoriskey def.  Jamie Loeb /  Chanel Simmonds, 6–4, 6–4

External links 
 2016 FSP Gold River Women's Challenger at ITFtennis.com
 Official website

2016 ITF Women's Circuit 
FSP Gold River Women's Challenger
2016 in sports in California
2016 in American tennis